Adalberto Mendez (born 23 October 1974) is a former Dominican sprinter who competed in the men's 100m competition at the 1996 Summer Olympics. He recorded a 10.60, not enough to qualify for the next round past the heats. His personal best is 10.53, set in 1995.

References

1974 births
Living people
Dominican Republic male sprinters
Athletes (track and field) at the 1996 Summer Olympics
Olympic athletes of the Dominican Republic